WVLK-FM (92.9 MHz) is a commercial FM radio station broadcasting a country music radio format. Licensed to Lexington, Kentucky, and owned by Cumulus Media, the station serves Central Kentucky's Bluegrass region. The station's studios and offices are located inside Kincaid Towers in downtown Lexington.

WVLK-FM has an effective radiated power (ERP) of 100,000 watts, the maximum for non-grandfathered FM stations. The transmitter is along Winchester Road (U.S. Route 60). With a nearly 100-mile radius coverage area, it can be picked up in the Louisville metropolitan area in the west and Morehead to the east. It can also be received in the Northern Kentucky suburbs of Cincinnati and as far south as Corbin.

History

Beautiful music and country
The station was first licensed as WVLK-FM on March 9, 1962. It began as a beautiful music station, playing 15 minute sweeps of mostly instrumental cover versions of popular songs. It was owned by WVLK Radio, Inc., along with its sister station, AM 590 WVLK.

In the 1980s, the station switched to country music but still kept its WVLK-FM call letters. On September 29, 2003, the station changed its call sign to WLXX. It wanted to establish an identity separate from 590 WVLK.

Nash-FM
On May 24, 2013, at 12:00PM, WLXX rebranded as "Nash FM 92.9". Nash FM is part of parent company Cumulus Media's national branding for many of its country music stations as well as publications and other platforms. On September 4, 2020, WLXX changed its call letters back to WVLK-FM.

It dropped Nash FM and was rebranded as "K 92.9", bringing back its heritage brand after 16 years. The WLXX call sign was moved to co-owned 101.5 JACK FM, which previously had been using WVLK-FM as its call letters.

Previous logos
 Logo under previous "Nash FM" branding

References

External links

VLK-FM
Radio stations established in 1962
1962 establishments in Kentucky
Cumulus Media radio stations
Country radio stations in the United States
Mass media in Lexington, Kentucky